The Physical Education Organization was an effort by the Government of Iran to promote the development of athletics and sporting activities of Iran. It was dissolved in late 2010 and its responsibilities transferred to the Ministry of Sport and Youth.

Chairmen 
 Mohammad Reza Pahlavi
 Baha-ud-Din Pazargad
 Hossein Ala'
 Hossein Samiei
 Mohammadali Tarbiat
 Allahyar Saleh
 Mahmoud Badr
 Seyed Ali Shaygan Mouli
 Amanullah Jahanbani
 Nader Batmanghelich
 Kamaleddin Jenab
 Abbas Izadpanah
 Mohammad Daftari
 Mohammad Hossein Amidi
 Manouchehr Gharagouzlou
 Parviz Khosravani
 Mostafa Amjadi
 Ali Hojjat Kashani
 Nader Jahanbani
 Hossein Fekri (acting) (1979)
 Hossein Shah-Hosseini (1979-1981)
 Mostafa Davoudi (1981-1983)
 Ismaeil Davoudi Shamsi (1983-1986)
 Ahmad Dargahi (1986-1989)
 Hassan Ghafourifard (1989-1994)
 Mostafa Hashemitaba (1994-2001)
 Mohsen Mehralizadeh (2001-2005)
 Mohammad Aliabadi (2005-2009)
 Ali Saeedlou (2009-2011)

See also
Ministry of Youth Affairs and Sports (Iran)

References

External links
Official website

Sports governing bodies in Iran